Uttara Town College is a college situated near Uttara at Dhaka, Bangladesh. It was established in 1998. It is a 5-storied building and it has a big place in front of it. The play ground is available for playing. The college has total 900 seats for students. It is privately operated and this college has its official website. It is also a university. So students can graduate from HSC and read there for higher education. The college consists of morning shift. The shift starts from 8:30 am and ends at 11:50 am.

Education 
Students from XI class to class XII read here. There are three groups in this college for higher secondary examination – Science, Business Studies and Arts. All the three groups are well taught by the teachers.

Teachers 
As of January 2019 there are more than 55 teachers in the college.

Students 
In this college, there are approximately 500 students.

Annual sports 
The college celebrates annual sports each year in the January. The ceremony is enjoyed and highly appreciated by all of the people of Uttara area.

Results
The college has good results since 1998.

References

External links 
 Official Webpage
 Uttara Town College on Facebook

Educational institutions of Uttara
Educational institutions established in 2013
Colleges in Dhaka District
2013 establishments in Bangladesh